Mary, mother of John Mark is mentioned in the Acts 12:12, which says that, after his escape from prison, Peter went to her house: "When he realized this, he went to the house of Mary, the mother of John whose other name was Mark, where many were gathered together and were praying." This seems to be the only mention of her in the Bible. From this it would appear that Mary's house was a place of assembly for the Apostles and other Christians.

References

Easton's Bible Dictionary, 1897

People in Acts of the Apostles
1st-century Jews
Women in the New Testament